Talinum is a genus of herbaceous succulent plants in the family Talinaceae (formerly in the family Portulacaceae) whose common names include flameflower.  Several species bear edible leaves, and Talinum fruticosum is widely grown in tropical regions as a leaf vegetable.  Talinum paniculatum is grown as an ornamental plant.

Selected species
 Talinum aurantiacum Engelm.
 Talinum caffrum (Thunb.) Eckl. & Zeyh.
 Talinum fruticosum (L.) Juss.
 Talinum paniculatum (Jacq.) Gaertn.

Formerly placed here
 Calandrinia ciliata (Ruiz & Pav.) DC. (as T. ciliatum Ruiz & Pav)
 Phemeranthus calcaricus (S. Ware)
 Phemeranthus mengesii (W.Wolf) Kiger (as T. mengesii W.Wolf)
 Phemeranthus parviflorus (Nutt.) Kiger (as T.  parviflorum Nutt.)
 Lewisia pygmaea (A.Gray) B.L.Rob. (as T. pygmaeum  A.Gray)
 Phemeranthus rugospermus (Holz.) Kiger (as T. rugospermum Holz.)
 Phemeranthus spinescens (Torr.) Hershk. (as T. spinescens Torr.)
 Montiopsis umbellata (Ruiz & Pav.) D.I.Ford (as T. umbellatum Ruiz & Pav.)

References

External links

Caryophyllales
Caryophyllales genera